The MVP Arena (originally Knickerbocker Arena, and then the Pepsi Arena and Times Union Center) is an indoor arena located in Albany, New York. It is configurable and can accommodate from 6,000 to 17,500 people, with a maximum seating capacity of 15,500 for sporting events.

The building, designed by Crozier Associates and engineered by Clough Harbour & Associates, was built by Beltrone/MLB at a cost of $69.4 million.

History
The arena was opened on January 30, 1990, as the Knickerbocker Arena with a performance by Frank Sinatra.

The naming rights of the arena were sold to Pepsi in 1997 and it was known as Pepsi Arena from 1997 to 2006. In May 2006, the naming rights were sold to the Times Union, a regional newspaper, and the name of the arena became the Times Union Center on January 1, 2007. In October 2021, the Times Union relinquished naming rights. On November 15, 2021, it was announced that health care provider MVP Health Services had successfully acquired the naming rights. The Times Union, which is the largest newspaper for the Albany area, had declined to renew its naming rights, leading to the MVP Arena's renaming. The new name took effect on January 1, 2022.

The building is managed by ASM Global.

The New York State Democratic Convention nominated then-First Lady Hillary Clinton as its U.S. Senate candidate at their statewide convention at Times Union Center on May 16, 2000. Her husband, President of the United States Bill Clinton, attended the event.

When the New Jersey Devils' AHL franchise relocated to this arena in the summer of 2010, the arena received a new scoreboard, LED ribbons above the luxury suites and new outside lighting, as well as an upgraded home team locker room.

The arena is home to the Albany FireWolves of the National Lacrosse League since late 2021.

Sports
The Siena College's men's basketball team has been a major tenant of the arena.

Previous tenants have included the Albany Firebirds (formerly Albany Conquest) of af2, the original Albany Firebirds of the AFL, the Albany Empire of the AFL, the Albany Patroons of the CBA, the Albany Choppers of the IHL, the Albany River Rats of the AHL, the Albany Attack of the NLL and the New York Kick of the NPSL II.

The MVP Arena also regularly hosts exhibition games of major sports leagues. The NBA, WNBA and NHL have all played games at the arena.

Andre Agassi played John McEnroe just three days after Agassi won the US Open in 1994.

The arena also hosts Monster Jam and Hot Wheels Monster Trucks Live.

Ice hockey
MVP Arena was home to the American Hockey League from 1993, when the Albany River Rats became the building's primary tenant until 2017. The River Rats won the Calder Cup championship in 1994–95.

On April 24, 2008, one of the longest games in the history of the American Hockey League took place at the arena. Ryan Potulny scored the winning goal for the Philadelphia Phantoms at 2:58 of the fifth overtime period after 142 minutes and 58 seconds of hockey, played over 5 hours and 38 minutes. In the process, River Rats goaltender Michael Leighton set a modern-day record by making 98 saves.

Following the River Rats' relocation to Charlotte, N.C., in 2010, the Albany Devils began play in the AHL.

It was announced on January 31, 2017, that the Devils would relocate to Binghamton following the completion of the 2016–17 season ending 24 years of AHL hockey in the arena. At the time of the relocation, the Devils were drawing the lowest average attendance in the league.

WWE
The MVP Arena has hosted many live events and televised shows for the WWE. Notable events include the 1992 Royal Rumble, where Ric Flair won the 30-man over the top rope match to become the new WWF Champion. The 2000 No Mercy was also held here and is the third No Mercy professional wrestling pay-per-view (PPV) event produced by the WWF. This event was notable for the return on Stone Cold Steve Austin after a neck injury sidelined him for the better part of a year. In 2006, at WWE New Year's Revolution, Edge cashed in the first ever Money in the Bank contract to defeat John Cena for the WWE Championship. On May 20, 2019, the WWE 24/7 Championship was introduced by Mick Foley to the WWE Universe on the Monday Night Raw with Titus O'Neil becoming the Inaugural champion. It was also here on March 22, 1999, that Steve Austin drove to the ring in a beer truck and gave a "beer bath" to Vince McMahon, Shane McMahon and The Rock.

College sports
The MVP Arena hosted the ECAC Hockey championships each March from 2003 until 2010, when the league announced the tournament was moved to Boardwalk Hall in Atlantic City, New Jersey; and is often home to the annual Metro Atlantic Athletic Conference basketball tournament (1990–96, 1998, 2000, 2002, 2004, 2006, 2008–10, and 2015–19).

In 2003, the MVP Arena hosted the NCAA basketball East Regional, which was won by Syracuse University on their way to their first national championship. The arena also hosted the first and second rounds of the 1995 NCAA Division I men's basketball tournament as the Knickerbocker Arena.

In 2008, the MVP Arena hosted the NCAA ice hockey East Regional tournament. The arena hosted ice-hockey regionals in even-numbered years from 2004 through 2010, which was the eighth time the East Regional has been held at the site.

In 2000, the MVP Arena hosted a regional quarterfinal between St. Lawrence University and Boston University, which went into quadruple overtime. The game was the longest game in the history of the tournament and, at the time, the second longest game in Division I men's college hockey history.

The MVP Arena also hosted the Frozen Four on two occasions, in 1992 (as Knickerbocker Arena) when Lake Superior State University defeated Wisconsin for the national championship, and again in 2001 as the Pepsi Arena when Boston College defeated North Dakota.

The venue hosted the NCAA women's basketball tournament from March 28 to 31, 2015 and NCAA hockey East Regional for the ninth time from March 25 to 27, 2016. The MVP Arena once again hosted the 1st and 2nd Rounds Of the 2023 Men's Basketball Tournament on March 17th and March 19th, 2023.

High school sports

The MVP Arena has been a regular host of the NYSPHSAA Wrestling Championships since 2005 and has won a bid to host the annual event each year through 2018. According to the Albany County Convention and Visitors Bureau, the wrestling state tournament annually contributes more than $1.5 million into the Capital Region economy, and in 2011 it was the second-largest sporting event in Albany County.

Arena Football 
Albany has had a long history of Arena Football. The Albany Firebirds were the first Arena Football team in Albany in 1990. They were successful, as they won ArenaBowl XIII in 1999. Then, after the team moved in 2000 they got an AF2 team called the Albany Conquest in 2002. They were not as successful as their predecessors, only making the playoffs a few times. In 2009, they rebranded back to the Albany Firebirds and made the playoffs, but lost in the first round. After 8 years, it was announced that the Albany Empire would be entering the Arena Football League in 2018 and they made the #1 seed in the playoffs in back-to-back seasons. In 2019, MVP Arena hosted ArenaBowl XXXII which Albany beat the Philadelphia Soul 45-27 and it was the final game ever played in the Arena Football League's second iteration. In 2020, it was announced that the National Arena League would be bringing a new team to Albany, and it brought back the Albany Empire name. The new Empire would win back-to-back NAL championships in 2021 and 2022.

Music

The first-ever event at the arena was a Frank Sinatra concert on January 30, 1990.

In 1990, the Grateful Dead recorded their 1996 release, Dozin' at the Knick, at the arena.

Whitesnake played at the arena during their Slip of the Tongue world tour in 1990. The concert took place February 15, and there were many empty seats due to a blizzard keeping many fans from getting to the arena.

Gloria Estefan played at the arena on August 30, 1991, during her 1991-1992 “Into The Light World Tour.”

Metallica played at the MVP Arena, then known as the Knickerbocker Arena, on February 28, 1992, during their Wherever We May Roam Tour. The band again played at the Arena, then known as the Pepsi Arena, on October 9, 2004, during their Madly in Anger with the World tour. Metallica played at the arena on November 12, 2009, during their World Magnetic Tour.

U2 played at the arena in 1992 and again in 2001.

Phish has played the arena 13 times, most recently during the fall tour of 2018.

Demi Lovato played at the arena on September 7, 2014, as part of their Demi World Tour.

On March 18, 2019, Ariana Grande opened her very popular Sweetener World Tour at the arena.

Celine Dion returned to the arena after 21 years on December 7, 2019, as part of her Courage World Tour. Dion's first performance at the arena took place on December 1, 1998, as part of her Let's Talk About Love World Tour.

Notable sellouts
 The Rolling Stones – September 17, 2005
 Paul McCartney, Out There Tour – July 5, 2014; sold out in 28 minutes on April 14, 2014.
 Philadelphia Soul at Albany Empire on April 14, 2018. First home game for the Empire.

Gallery

See also
 List of NCAA Division I basketball arenas

References

External links

Official website

Albany Devils
Albany Empire (AFL)
Albany FireWolves
Albany River Rats
Basketball venues in New York (state)
College basketball venues in the United States
College ice hockey venues in the United States
Continental Basketball Association venues
Event venues established in 1990
Indoor arenas in New York (state)
Indoor ice hockey venues in New York (state)
Indoor lacrosse venues in the United States
Indoor soccer venues in New York (state)
Mixed martial arts venues in New York (state)
Siena Saints men's basketball
Sports venues in Albany, New York
Sports venues completed in 1990
Tennis venues in New York (state)
Wrestling venues in New York (state)
1990 establishments in New York (state)